Asha Abdullah Juma (born 13 November 1950) is a Zanzibari politician who is a Member of the National Assembly of Tanzania.
She served as a Chama Cha Mapinduzi Member of the Zanzibar House of Representatives, and as Minister for Labour, Youth Development, Women and Children in the Revolutionary Government of Zanzibar, from 2005 to 2010.

She was educated at the University of East Anglia (MA Gender Analysis and Development, 2000) and the Open University of Tanzania (MBA, 2013).

References

1950 births
Living people
Alumni of the University of East Anglia
Open University of Tanzania alumni
Members of the Zanzibar House of Representatives
Government ministers of Zanzibar
Members of the National Assembly (Tanzania)
Place of birth missing (living people)